Christopher Codrington (1668 – 7 April 1710) was a Barbadian-born colonial administrator, planter, book collector and military officer. He is sometimes known as Christopher Codrington the Younger to distinguish him from his father.

Codrington inherited one of the largest sugar plantations in Barbados. Under his will he established and endowed Codrington College, now part of the University of the West Indies with his estates in Barbados and Barbuda. His will also endowed the Codrington Library at All Souls College, Oxford with a gift of books and money. In November 2020, his name was removed from the library, as his wealth had been derived from slave labour.

Early life
Christopher Codrington (III) was born in Barbados in 1668, the eldest son of Colonel Christopher Codrington and his wife Gertrude. The Codrington Plantations were one of the largest in Barbados and the family was extremely wealthy. He had a younger brother, who suffered from mental disability.

Codrington never married, although he had a natural mixed-race son, William, from a relationship with Mauldline Morange. William was left £500 in his father's will and became a plantation owner in Jamaica.

Career
Later described by Edmund Burke as "by far ... the most distinguished ornament Barbados ever produced", Codrington was academically talented; educated in England, he studied at Christ Church, Oxford, and was elected to All Souls College in 1690. Part of an intellectual circle that included Charles Boyle and Joseph Addison, he became known as an avid book collector.

In 1693, he returned to the West Indies to take part in an unsuccessful attack on the French possession of Martinique, before serving in Flanders during the Nine Years' War. Having fought with distinction at Huy and Namur in 1695, William III gave him a commission as captain in the Foot Guards. This was often a largely honorary post, since only 16 of the nominal 24 companies were actually formed; under the practice known as double-ranking, Guards officers held a second, higher army position and Codrington ranked as a lieutenant colonel.

His father died shortly after the Peace of Ryswick ended the Nine Years War in 1697, and he was appointed Governor of the Leeward Islands in 1699. He became embroiled in a number of local disputes and accusations of abuse of power, which were investigated by Parliament. He was exonerated just before the War of the Spanish Succession began in 1702; after successfully retaking Saint Kitts from the French, he resigned after a failed attack on Guadeloupe in 1703, which severely damaged his health. His attempts to re-enter politics proved unsuccessful and he spent the rest of his life in retirement on his Barbadian estates.

Legacies

After his death on 7 April 1710, Codrington's body was brought to England and buried on 19 June that year in All Souls Chapel; his will left £10,000 and £6,000 worth of books to endow the Christopher Codrington library in All Souls College, which includes his statue by Sir Henry Cheere. In January 2021, his name was removed from the library due to his association with slave labour, and a plaque was placed outside commemorating those who worked on the Codrington plantations.

His other legacies included £1,500 for a monument to his father in Westminster Abbey, while the Codrington Plantations and part of Barbuda were left to the Society for the Propagation of the Gospel in Foreign Parts to establish a college in Barbados. Delays caused by legal challenges meant that Codrington College was not completed until 1745, and was initially confined to white students. It remains an Anglican theological school and is now part of the University of the West Indies. The Codrington School, first established in 1917 before closing in the 1990s, was reopened in 2002 as an International Baccalaureate school.

References

Sources
 
 
 
 
 
 
 
 

1668 births
1710 deaths
Colony of Barbados people
Alumni of Christ Church, Oxford
Fellows of All Souls College, Oxford
British military personnel of the War of the Spanish Succession
Grenadier Guards officers
Governors of the Leeward Islands
Sugar plantation owners
Codrington family
British slave owners